Highspeed Etoile (stylized as HIGHSPEED Etoile) is an upcoming Japanese original anime television series. The series features character designs by Takuya Fujima. It is also planned to feature collaborations with the Japanese Super Formula Championship. The series is set to premiere in 2024.

Characters

References

External links
 

Animated television series about auto racing
Anime with original screenplays
Motorsports in anime and manga
Upcoming anime television series